Professor Shareen Heather Doak (born 1 December 1978) holds a personal chair in Genotoxicology and Cancer at Swansea University and is a leading female British scientist in the field of Nanotoxicology globally.

Education 
Doak was educated in Saudi Arabia in her early years before returning to the UK to complete her A levels at St. Michaels School in Llanelli, South Wales. She studied for a Bachelor of Science (BSc) in Genetics at Swansea University, and obtained a 1st class honors degree in 2000. Remaining at Swansea University, Doak completed her PhD in Oncology and Cancer biology at the Genetics department in 2003 under the supervision of Professor Jim Parry and Dr. Liz Parry.

Career 
After working for a short period as a post-doctoral researcher and genetics tutor at Swansea University, on research projects including biomarkers for prostate cancer and identifying thresholds dose-response for direct-acting genotoxins, Doak gained a Research Councils UK (RCUK) Academic Fellowship in 2007 which was supported by both the Swansea University Medical School and the Swansea University College of Engineering at Swansea University. In 2014, Doak was promoted to a personal chair in Genotoxicology and Cancer, as one of the youngest scientists to be awarded a professorship at Swansea University. Alongside her research projects in nano(geno)toxicology, In Vitro toxicology, and prostate cancer, Doak is Director of the Centre for NanoHealth at Swansea University Medical School]as well as being a UK and EUROTOX Registered Toxicologist.

Recent grants

References

British nanotechnologists
Living people
Swansea University
1978 births